Events from the year 1404 in Ireland.

Incumbent
Lord: Henry IV

Events

Births

Deaths
 Flann Óc mac Séoan Ó Domhnalláin was Ollamh Síol Muireadaigh
 John Colton, Archbishop of Armagh
 John Keppock, a judge of the late fourteenth century, who held the offices of Lord Chief Justice of Ireland and Chief Baron of the Irish Exchequer.

References